The Xukuru  (Xucuru) are an indigenous people of Brazil, with a population of approximately 8,500, living in the state of Pernambuco, Brazil. They have recently gained governmental  recognition of their rights to their indigenous homeland in the Ororubá Mountains, though this has brought them into conflict with the local settler population of the region. In 1998, a Xukuru leader, Chicão (Francisco Lacerda, also Cacique Xikão), was assassinated, apparently because of his opposition to the encroachment of ranchers in Xukuru territory. However his children carried on his legacy.

An extensive ethnography has been written by Hohenthal (1954).

References

External links
www.xukuru.de

Ethnic groups in Brazil
Indigenous peoples of Eastern Brazil